The Forgotten River is located in northern Fiordland, New Zealand and is a tributary of the Olivine River. The Forgotten River starts at the Forgotten River Col at the western edge of the Olivine Ice Plateau in the Five Finger Range.  It flows south-westward to join the Olivine River as a hanging valley south of Four Brothers Pass.

The river was explored in 1864 by Alphonse Barrington, James Farrell and Antoine Simonin. It is currently within the Olivine Wilderness Area which has limited  aircraft access.

See also
List of rivers of New Zealand

References

External links
Forgotten River and the Olivine Ice Plateau The New Zealand Railways Magazine, Volume 12, Issue 8 (November 1, 1937)
Guide to the Forgotten River area by Shaun Barnett Wilderness Magazine (July 18, 2017)

Rivers of Fiordland